Jeff Yu, or Yu Ji-Young, (born October 30, 1978) is a former association football player.

Yu is the first American football (soccer) player to have played in the Korean K-League. He represented Ulsan Hyundai Horang-i in 2000 and Bucheon SK in 2001.

Yu had a brief spell with VfL Osnabrück in the German 2. Bundesliga.

References

External links 
 

1978 births
Living people
American soccer players
K League 1 players
Ulsan Hyundai FC players
Jeju United FC players
American expatriate soccer players
American people of Korean descent
Averett University alumni
Association football forwards